West Milford High School is a four-year comprehensive community public high school that serves students in ninth through twelfth grades from West Milford, in Passaic County, New Jersey, United States, operating as the lone secondary school of the West Milford Township Public Schools. The school has been accredited by the Middle States Association of Colleges and Schools Commission on Elementary and Secondary Schools since 1968 and is accredited through January 2023.

As of the 2021–22 school year, the school had an enrollment of 936 students and 91.8 classroom teachers (on an FTE basis), for a student–teacher ratio of 10.2:1. There were 91 students (9.7% of enrollment) eligible for free lunch and 42 (4.5% of students) eligible for reduced-cost lunch.

History
Students from West Milford had attended Butler High School for grades 9-12 as part of a longstanding sending/receiving relationship that existed until September 1962, when West Milford opened its own high school. The Butler Public Schools had served students from large parts of Morris and Passaic counties, until soaring local enrollment led the district to notify feeder communities in 1954 that they would have to find alternative education options for their high school students. For some time, Macopin School (now the middle school) was the only secondary school in town until the current High School was built.

Awards, recognition and rankings
The school was the 146th-ranked public high school in New Jersey out of 339 schools statewide in New Jersey Monthly magazine's September 2014 cover story on the state's "Top Public High Schools", using a new ranking methodology. The school had been ranked 163rd in the state of 328 schools in 2012, after being ranked 185th in 2010 out of 322 schools listed. The magazine ranked the school 191st in 2008 out of 316 schools. The school was ranked 169th in the magazine's September 2006 issue, which surveyed 316 schools across the state. Schooldigger.com ranked the school tied for 167th out of 381 public high schools statewide in its 2011 rankings (an increase of 48 positions from the 2010 ranking) which were based on the combined percentage of students classified as proficient or above proficient on the mathematics (80.1%) and language arts literacy (94.7%) components of the High School Proficiency Assessment (HSPA).

Academics

Honors 
West Milford High School offers Advanced Placement (AP), honors and college preparatory classes to its students.  Students are placed in the Honors or AP program based on various criteria.  The school offers many Honors and Advanced Placement courses as core classes and electives, including:

History:

 World History Honors
 AP World History
 AP United States History I/II Honors
 AP United States Government and Politics
 AP Psychology
 AP Economics
 Western Civilization Honors

Mathematics:

 Algebra I Honors
 Geometry Honors
 Algebra II Honors
 Pre-Calculus/Trigonometry Honors
 AP Calculus A Honors
 AP Calculus AB
 AP Calculus BC
 AP Computer Science A
 AP Computer Science Principles
 AP Statistics

English:

 English I Honors
 English II Honors (American Literature)
 AP English: Language and Composition
 AP English: Literature and Composition

Science:

 Biology Honors
 Chemistry Honors
 Physics Honors
 Advanced Chemistry Honors
 AP Physics
 AP Chemistry
 AP Biology
 Anatomy and Physiology Honors
 AP Environmental Science

World Language:

 Spanish IV Honors
 French IV Honors
 German IV Honors
 Italian IV Honors
 Spanish V Honors
 French V Honors
 German V Honors
 Italian V Honors
 AP Spanish V Honors
 AP French V Honors
 AP German V Honors
 AP Italian V Honors.

Fine Arts:

 Honors Band (applicable to both Symphonic Band and Wind Ensemble)
 Honors Choir (applicable to all choirs)
 AP Art History
 Advanced Art
 AP Studio for 3D and Drawing

AP Capstone:

 AP Seminar
 AP Research

West Milford High School offers other non-AP and non-honors electives, such as:

 Accounting for Business
 Advanced Photography
 Animation
 Applied Instrumental Music
 Architectural Design and Drawing
 Studio Art 1 & 2
 Auto Occupations
 Automotive & Transportation Technology
 Concert Band
 Symphonic Band
 Wind Ensemble
 Basic Art
 Business Web Page Design
 Business Law
 Child Development
 Chorus
 Highlands Chorale
 Men's Chorus
 Women's Chorus
 Concert Choir
 Digital Art 1 & 2
 Communication Design
 Communications/Public Relations
 Culinary Arts
 Entrepreneurship and Small Business Management
 Fashion Merchandising
 Food, Nutrition and You
 Graphic Arts Communications 1, 2 & 3
 Guitar
 Harmony And Theory
 Hospitality and Tourism
 History of Film
 Interior Design
 International Business
 Tomorrow's Teachers:Internship
 Marketing 1
 Mechanical Drawing/ CAD & CAD 2
 Painting, Illustration
 Personal Auto Maintenance
 Photography 1 & 2
 Piano
 Principles of Engineering Design
 Rock of Ages
 Sculpture
 Sports & Entertainment Marketing
 Intro to Theater Arts
 Theater Arts
 TV Communication Arts & Media 1, 2 & 3
 Video Game Design
 World Crafts
 World Cuisines

Clubs and activities 
West Milford High School offers a variety of afterschool clubs and activities for its students.  These clubs are run by the student members under the supervision of WMHS staff members, thus allowing these clubs to truly by student-run.  These include clubs, student-government programs, peer leadership programs, honorary societies, and scholastic competition organizations:

 Art Club provides art students and students who are unable to take Art class during the school day to do art while having many resources and supplies available to them.  This club is advised by a school art teacher.
 Chess Club
 West Milford High School has class offices at each grade level, with elected students representing their classmates in planning fundraisers, proms, and other class functions.  Each graduating class has its own advisor (a WMHS staff member) and re-elects its officers (President, Vice President, Treasurer, and Secretary) every school year.
 DECA is a comprehensive business program that improves the students' understanding of marketing and advertising, while building leadership and administrative skills, through business-related tasks and projects.  West Milford's award-winning DECA team sponsors school events, works with charities, and competes on a state and regional level. In 2008, students went to Giants Stadium to learn about sports marketing.  This club is advised by the DECA teacher.
 ERASE and GSA include politically minded students who desire a more inclusive environment in the school, community, and world at large. They are open to all students and organize events such as the Day of Silence. It is advised by several teachers.
 Foreign Language Honor Societies (Spanish, French, German, Italian) induct members who have shown proficiency and outstanding knowledge in their chosen language of study. The members are from the IV Honors and AP V Honors courses, and must have met numerous criteria in order to be considered for nomination and induction. Each group has an elected executive board with members who serve as President, Vice President, Treasurer, and Secretary. The clubs organize multicultural events and host a World Cuisine Night at which students prepare and serve foods from many nations and cultures to the guests. Each society is advised by a teacher of that language.
 Gaming Club
 Green Team (formerly known as the Environmental Club) is for students who deal with pressing environmental issues and who monitor and continually enhance the school's recycling program.  The group has initiated a school-wide recycling program that has included putting separate recycling receptacles for cans/bottles and paper in every classroom. It is advised by a Science teacher.
 Highland Jazz Choir is a select group of choir students that performs jazz repertoire throughout the year. The group received an Honorable mention at the prestigious Berklee Jazz Festival in Boston in 2016. 
 History Club is open to any students who have a passion for the subject of History.  Students from all History courses are able to join.  The club watches movies on historical figures and plays interactive games to enhance their knowledge on certain time periods.  The club is advised by a History teacher.
 Industrial Arts
 Interact Club participants perform volunteer work in the schools and in the community. They often work at various school-sponsored events, including dances and activity nights.  They are advised by a History teacher and a town councilwoman.
 Miniature Golf Club
 Mock Trial
 West Milford High School participates in the Model Congress program.  Selected AP Government and Politics students meet with other schools' delegations and carry out the functions of a congress, writing and passing bills on various topics and issues.  West Milford High School's Model Congress team won the Passaic County championship during the 2007–08 school year. This team is advised by WMHS's AP Government and Politics teacher.
 Mu Alpha Theta Mathematics Honor Society includes inducted members who have shown proficiency and outstanding knowledge in Mathematics.  The members are from a wide range of Mathematics courses, and must have met numerous criteria in order to be considered for nomination and induction.  Mu Alpha Theta hosts multiple mathematics competitions for students from Macopin Middle School during the year.  This group's elected executive board includes the President, Vice President, Treasurer, and Secretary. It is advised by a Mathematics teacher.
 The annual Musical is put on every year at the start of March. The shows are renowned for their quality in production and performance. Recent productions include "The Drowsy Chaperone", "Young Frankenstein", "How To Succeed in Business Without Really Trying", "The Little Mermaid", "The Addams Family", "Anything Goes", and "Into the Woods".
 National Honor Society inducts members who have shown outstanding scholarship during their time at West Milford High School.  The members must have met and exceeded numerous criteria, and are required to perform many hours of school and community service, including free peer tutoring.  Membership in this society of scholars is a great distinction and honor, and is highly respected by post-secondary institutions of higher learning (colleges, universities, graduate schools, technical/vocational schools, and trade schools).  The group is advised by an English teacher and has an elected executive board with student members who serve as President, Vice President, Treasurer, Secretary, and Historian.
 Newspaper Club regularly produces the school's student paper, the Highland Echo.
 Robotics Club
 Peers As Leaders (PALs) is a group of hand-selected student in the junior and senior classes serves as peer leaders and role models for the other students of WMHS.  This group plays an integral role in organizing and running the Freshmen Orientation, peer mediation, conflict resolution, and assisting new students with becoming acclimated to the school. The group has an Executive Board composed of a President, Vice President, and Secretary, and is run by two Guidance Counselors and a Science teacher.
 Peer Tutoring offers afterschool sessions are administered and operated by candidates and members of the National Honor Society.  These open tutoring groups are cost-free to students and allow students to be educated by their peers who are proficient in certain subjects.
 Science Olympiad
 Science National Honor Society is a competitive scholastic team that competes against other high schools in New Jersey in the subject areas of Biology, Chemistry, and Physics. Membership on this team is open to any student that is enrolled in a science course.
 Stage Audio/Lighting handles lighting and audio for the various events that take place in the auditorium.
 Student Council has seven elected executive council members and up to 50 general members that represent the other students of WMHS.  Sophomores, juniors, and seniors are eligible to run for the offices of President, Vice President, Treasurer, Secretary, and Communications Director, Teachers Lesion and Student Lesion.  This organization is a separate entity from class offices, but does work with the individual class offices on certain projects to benefit the school.  Students running for a Student Council office must deliver a speech, which is recorded on a video and viewed during English classes.  Students are able to vote during that class period in their individual English class and through online balloting to ensure that every student has the opportunity to view the speeches and cast their vote.  The Student Council is the only schoolwide student government organization and its officers are often considered the School President, School Vice President, School Treasurer, School Secretary, and School Communications Director.  The group organizes and sponsors numerous school and community events, working with the school and district wide administrators to enhance the school environment.  The WMHS student representative at the West Milford Board of Education meetings is a member of the Student Council Executive Council. The Student Council runs the Homecoming and other events throughout the year, Senior Choice Awards, Highlander Day, Pep Rallies and The Annual West Milford Spooktacular, winner of the coveted Character.org Award. 
 Student Wellness and Yoga 
 Varsity Club is open exclusively to sophomores, juniors, and seniors who possess a Varsity letter in a sport. The Varsity Club organizes and runs the school Pep Rallies and raises funds to help the Athletic Department. It also organizes fundraisers to aid current and former WMHS students who have serious illnesses. The club is responsible for updating the outdoor schedule board, which is located outside the business wing of the school, where all of the athletic teams' scheduled games for the week are posted. The club has an Executive Board composed of a President, Vice President, Treasurer, and Secretary, and is advised by a Special Education teacher.
 The Way
 Weightlifting/Conditioning
 West Milford Poetry Society
 Yearbook Club is responsible for producing the annual school yearbook.  Members of this club work together to gather information on sports teams and clubs, prepare picture profiles for graduating seniors, and lay out all pictures and text for the final production of the yearbook.  They are responsible for creating the treasured keepsake by which many people remember their high school years. This club is advised by a Computers teacher and a Special Education teacher.

Highlander Band and Color Guard

Highlander Marching Band

The West Milford High School Highlander Marching Band and Color Guard has won hundreds of awards and accolades over the years under the direction of Dr. Brian McLaughlin, Matt Gramata and color guard director Pete Shaver. Awards and honors include:

 2021 USBands National Champions, Group III A
 2021 USBands NJ State Champions, Group III A
 2018 USBands National Champions, Group V A
 2018 USBands NJ State Champions, Group V A
 2018 US Marine Corps Esprit de Corps Award
 2018 USBands Yamaha Cup, Group V A Champions
 2017 USBands NJ State Champions, Group V A
 2017 USBands Yamaha Cup, Group V A Champions, MetLife Stadium
 2015 USBands NJ State Champions, Group V A
 2015 Yamaha Cup, Group V A, Champions, MetLife Stadium
 2013 North Jersey Independent Marching Band Circuit 1st Place
 2004–2012, 2014-2018 1st Place Randolph "Under the Stars" Competition
 2009 & 2010 USSBA Northern States Champions, Group V A
 Numerous 1st Place Awards at the New York City St. Patrick's Day Parade

In addition to marching competitively, the Highlander Band holds its annual Tattoo and Military Concert every November. Each year, many bands travel to West Milford to partake in this exciting display of kilts, bagpipes, marching precision, and the show repertoire of both the Clifton High School Mustang Band and the Highlander Band. Recently, the tattoo has been held in honor of local veterans, and volunteer emergency personnel. Over the past few years, guests have included the Queen's Piper and the USMC Leatherneck Pipes and Drums.

West Milford Color Guard

The West Milford Highlander Color Guard is under the direction of Mr. Peter Shaver. In the Fall, the colorguard performs as a unit with the Highlander Marching Band. Following the conclusion of the marching season, the colorguard performs as a stand-alone unit at competitions across the United States. The West Milford Colorguard has been recognized over the years as both MAIN, Musical Arts Conference and WGI Regional medalists; they have also been a WGI World Championship Semi-Finalist.

In 2019, the color guard won the WGI Philadelphia Regional Championship and Mid Atlantic Indoor Network (MAIN) SA Championships. For several weeks, they were ranked nationally in the top 10 among the Scholastic A Class color guards in WGI and completed their WGI season as a World Championship Semi-Finalist.

Jazz ensemble 
The jazz program at the West Milford Township School District was established in 2010. All bands are created through an audition process that encourages participation regardless of experience in the genre. With a comprehensive study of styles and history, all bands have the opportunity to participate in festivals, concerts and the creation of combos. Recent highlights of the West Milford Jazz Ensemble include six New Jersey State Finals appearances in seven years of existence; including 2nd-place finishes at the NJAJE State Jazz Finals in 2015, 2016, 2017 and 2018. In February 2017, the West Milford Jazz Ensemble participated for the first time, and was awarded 1st place at the Berklee Jazz Festival in Boston, Massachusetts. The Jazz Ensemble was also selected to perform at the National Association for Music Education All-Eastern Convention in Atlantic City.

Indoor percussion 
West Milford Indoor Percussion is an extension of the Highlander Band program that combines the marching arts with the use of percussion instruments. West Milford Indoor Percussion has won numerous awards and honors. In recent years, West Milford Indoor Percussion won two USBands Division 1A Indoor Championships and is a WGI Regional Finalist.

Model United Nations
The award-winning West Milford High School Model United Nations team has achieved success in New Jersey and around the northeastern United States, and is widely regarded as a highly successful program in the state and this region of the country.  The team, which is advised by the Supervisor of History & Social Sciences, Mr. Oliver Pruksarnukal, has attended conferences at various premier locations, including Princeton University, United Nations Headquarters (New York City), Yale University, the Historic District of  Philadelphia, Saint Peter's College (Jersey City, New Jersey), Bergen County Academies (Hackensack, New Jersey), and Passaic County Law Day (Passaic County Courthouse, Paterson, NJ). The team was recognized at the 2007 United Nations Association of the United States of America (UNA-USA) International Conference with award winners for Outstanding Delegation and Honorable Delegation.

At the 2006 Princeton University Model UN Conference, West Milford won the overall team championship.

At the 2007 UNA-USA UN Headquarters International Model UN Conference, West Milford students won four awards and the team won second place overall.  Two of these were for Outstanding Delegation, while the other two were for Honorable Delegation.

At the 2008 Yale University Model UN Conference, out of 50+ schools, only four of which were public, West Milford's Model UN team placed highly and enjoyed great success, taking home third place overall.  West Milford won five honorable delegate awards at the conference.

West Milford students also won seven awards at the 2008 Bergen County Academies Model UN Conference, with the team taking home Outstanding School Delegation for winning the overall championship.

West Milford's Model UN team won the overall championship at the Saint Peter's College High School Model United Nations conference for the third year in a row in 2008, taking home 10 individual awards, including four for best delegate.

At the 2009 Philadelphia Model United Nations Conference, West Milford won the overall team championship and Outstanding School Delegation, while taking home six awards for individual student delegations. Two delegations won Best Delegation, two won Outstanding Delegation, and two won Distinguished Delegation.

West Milford dominated the Saint Peter's College High School Model United Nations conference for the fourth consecutive year in 2009.  The team won eleven awards overall, which was nearly double the next-highest team's total, with five individual students winning for their individual delegate performance, five pairs of students winning for their delegation, and one pair winning for their position paper.

West Milford's Model UN team coordinated, hosted, and moderated the first student-run Board of Education debate in New Jersey history on April 9, 2009. The four members of the Executive Board (President, Vice President, Treasurer, Chief of Staff) were the four moderators, with the other club members serving in other capacities, including timekeepers, ushers, and concessions workers.  The debate featured the five candidates for the three available Board of Education seats.  The candidates were asked questions ranging in topics from the school cafeteria program to gifted education programs to how to curb substance abuse among district students to what they would want their legacy to be once their time on the Board has ended.  The event was met with great praise and acclaim from the public and gave the voters of West Milford an opportunity to learn where the candidates actually stood on the critical issues affecting the students of the district.

Athletics
The West Milford High School Highlanders compete in the Big North Conference, which is comprised of public and private high schools in Bergen and Passaic counties, and was established following a reorganization of sports leagues in Northern New Jersey by the New Jersey State Interscholastic Athletic Association (NJSIAA). In the 2009–10 school year, the school competed in the North Jersey Tri-County Conference, which was established on an interim basis to facilitate the realignment. Prior to the realignment, the school had participated in the Skyline Division of the Northern Hills Conference, an athletic conference comprised of public and private high schools located in Essex, Morris and Passaic counties. With 796 students in grades 10-12, the school was classified by the NJSIAA for the 2019–20 school year as Group III for most athletic competition purposes, which included schools with an enrollment of 761 to 1,058 students in that grade range. The football team competes in the Patriot Blue division of the North Jersey Super Football Conference, which includes 112 schools competing in 20 divisions, making it the nation's biggest football-only high school sports league. The school was classified by the NJSIAA as Group III North for football for 2022–2024.

The school participates as the host school / lead agency for a joint cooperative ice hockey team with Pequannock Township High School. The school participates in co-op boys / girls swimming teams with Lakeland Regional High School as the host school. These co-op programs operate under agreements scheduled to expire at the end of the 2023–24 school year.

The school offers 28 varsity sports during the fall, winter, and spring seasons:

Fall sports offered are Cheerleading, Cross-Country (B&G), Field Hockey, Football, Gymnastics, Soccer (B&G), Tennis (G) and Volleyball (G).

Winter sports offered are Basketball (B&G), Bowling, Cheerleading, Dance Team, Fencing (B&G), Ice Hockey, Indoor Track and Field (B&G), Skiing (B&G) and Wrestling.

Spring sports offered are Baseball, Golf (B&G), Lacrosse (JV only), Outdoor Track and Field (B&G), Softball, Tennis (B) and Volleyball (B).

Field hockey
The field hockey team won the North I Group IV state sectional championship in 1985 and the North I Group III title in 2011. In 2016 and 2017, the team won the Passaic County Tournament to become back-to-back county champions.

Softball
The Highlanders softball program has won nine Passaic County Tournament titles: in 1993, 1995, 2002, 2003, 2005, 2007, 2008, 2010 and 2011. The team has also won 24 conference championships (18 in the Northern Hills Conference, plus six in its predecessor, the Skyline Conference) and eight state sectional titles in North I, Group III and North I, Group IV. The softball team has won at least 20 games in 20 consecutive seasons. Varsity Head Coach Jim Dransfield retired in 2013 with a career record of 547-108 during his 23-year tenure, ranking him among the winningest coaches in the state and the winningest all-time in North Jersey. Dransfield became the winningest softball coach in North Jersey (Bergen and Passaic Counties) with a 6–1 win over Hawthorne High School, giving him 471 for his career and moving him past former Clifton High School coach Rich LaDuke for the most all-time.

The softball program has produced two of the top ten winningest pitchers in New Jersey history: Karin Kolatac ('96) and Corinne Reiser ('00), who won 79 and 87 games during their high school careers, respectively. Kolatac was an All-American in 1996 (FP Magazine, NFCA). The program also boasts two-time FP Magazine All-American catcher Jen Pawol ('95) and DH Laura Remia ('97), the all-time leading home run hitter in the history of NCAA Division III college softball.

In 2003, the softball team won the North I, Group IV state sectional championship, edging Clifton High School 1–0 in the tournament final. The 2004 team repeated the title, after a shift to Group III, with a 4–2 win over Ramapo High School.

In the 2007 season, the softball team won the Northern Hills-Skyline championship with a 2–1 win over Mount Saint Dominic Academy, and won the Passaic County championship with a 3–1 win over Clifton High School, the eventual state Group IV champions and the #2-ranked team in New Jersey in the final poll by The Star-Ledger. The Highlanders finished the season ranked #13, after reaching as high as #2 during the regular season.

The 2008 softball team was ranked first by The Record in its preseason poll for North Jersey. The team won its second-straight county title by capping off its tournament run with a 5–2 victory over Hawthorne High School, after the team defeated rival Lakeland Regional High School by a score of 11–0 in the semi-final round. The team has competed in the Mount Saint Dominic Academy Invitational tournament, and won the conference championship for the second-straight year, after beating Mount Saint Dominic Academy by a score of 4–0, Millburn High School by a score of 7–1, and Mount Saint Dominic Academy again by a score of 2–0. The team finished the season with a record of 22–8, making it the team's 19th consecutive 20-win season.

The 2009 softball team was ranked #3 by The Record in its preseason poll for North Jersey  and was ranked as high as #2 in that poll.  The team was ranked as high as #6 in the Star-Ledger Top 20 poll and won 20 games for the 20th consecutive season. The team finished with a record of 20–5.

Boys' basketball
The Highlanders boys' basketball team has won four conference titles, in 1973–74, 2003–04, 2007–08, and 2008–09, and has been to three sectional championship games, in 2005–06, 2007–08, and 2008–09.  The 2003–04 team went 23–3, going 16–0 in conference play, and advanced to the state sectional semi-finals where they lost to Teaneck High School.  The 2005–06 team advanced to the state sectional finals before losing to Northern Valley Regional High School at Old Tappan by two points.  The 2007–08 team finished with a 21–6 record and captured its third conference championship (12–2 conference record). It received the #1 seed in the state sectional tournament but lost to Wayne Valley High School in the sectional finals, 48–45. The 2008–09 team finished with a 20–7 record and captured its fourth conference championship overall and second in a row (12–2 conference record). The team made its second consecutive appearance in the sectional finals and third in four years, but lost to Teaneck High School 58–51 in overtime.

Girls' basketball
The Highlanders girls' basketball team defeated Washington Township High School by a score of 54-45 in the tournament final to win the Group IV state championship in 1995 before losing to top-seeded St. John Vianney High School by a score of 68–36 in the finals of the New Jersey Tournament of Champions.

Boys' cross country
The Highlanders boys' cross country team was the Passaic County Championship winners in 2001, 2002, 2007 and 2017. The team won the North Jersey Group IV state sectional championship in 2001.

Girls' cross country
The Highlanders girls' cross country team won State titles from 2005 to 2008.

Wrestling
The wrestling team won the North I Group IV state sectional title in 1996, 1997 and 2003.

The Highlanders wrestling program has won many conference, county and district championships.  Most notable of the seasons was in 2001–2002, when longtime wrestling Coach Mike Blakely led the Highlanders to the Northern Hills Conference, Passaic County and state district championships. The following two seasons the Highlanders continued as Northern Hills Conference & Passaic County Champions (2002–2003, 2003–2004, 2005–2006). In the 2007–08 season, the Highlander wrestling team won the Passaic County Championship.

Ice hockey
The Highlanders ice hockey program has won the county championship in the 2001–02, 2003–04, and 2006–07 seasons. During the 2008–2009 season, the team won the Nardello Cup by defeating Nutley High School 2–0 in the championship game. In the 2009–2010 season, the team went the farthest into the state tournament in school history. The team defeated number one seed and 2009 state champions, Ramsey High School, by a score of 4–2. Starting in the 2018–19 season, West Milford High School and Pequannock Township High School play for a combined co-operative team.

Football
The Highlanders football team went 10–1 in the 2003–04 season, making it to the state semi-finals before losing to Northern Valley Regional High School at Demarest. The team won the conference, going 9–0 in league play. This marked the second time in school history and the first time in 16 years the team won the conference. The most monumental win of the season came against the Delbarton School Green Wave, 28–15, a parochial powerhouse that hadn't lost a conference game in five years. Delbarton hadn't lost to West Milford since 1995. The team was led by the 2003 Passaic County defense of the year, which posted four shutouts, including three consecutive, and never gave up more than 18 points in a game.

Highlander Day
This school-wide carnival occurs annually at the end of the school year, from 11:30am until the end of the school day outside on the back field at West Milford High School. Booths are run by individual clubs and groups, with all students being invited to participate in the festivities. Some of the booth themes have included "Win a Gold Fish", a hot dog eating contest, a taco eating contest, a dunk tank, pie throwing, face painting, pictures with friends in costumes, and more. A local band played live throughout the afternoon's festivities in 2009. This event is coordinated and run by the Student Council with assistance from many other school clubs.

Distinguished Scholars Recognition Awards Reception
On April 20, 2009, the school and district administrators held the first annual Distinguished Scholars Recognition Awards Reception in the high school cafeteria.  This event recognized the top fifteen ranked students in each of the four graduating classes in the high school.

Notable alumni

 Lennie Friedman (born 1976), former offensive lineman with the Cleveland Browns.
 Billy Howerdel (born 1970), musician primarily known for his involvement with the bands Ashes Divide and A Perfect Circle.
 Dale Soules (born 1946), television and stage actress, known for appearing in Orange is the New Black.
 Kevin Walker (born 1965), former linebacker for the Cincinnati Bengals.
 Donna Weinbrecht (born 1965), gold medalist in mogul skiing at the 1992 Winter Olympics.

Administration
Core members of the school's administration are:
 Matthew Strianse, Principal
 Nicholas Pollaro, Assistant Principal
 John Schutte, Assistant Principal

References

External links
 West Milford High School
 West Milford Township Public Schools
 
 West Milford Township Public Schools, National Center for Education Statistics
 West Milford High School Model United Nations
 West Milford Highlanders Softball

West Milford, New Jersey
1962 establishments in New Jersey
Educational institutions established in 1962
Public high schools in Passaic County, New Jersey